Woolley may refer to:

Places

England
Woolley, Cambridgeshire, a hamlet
Woolley, Cornwall
Woolley, Derbyshire
Woolley, Somerset
Woolley, West Berkshire
Woolley, West Yorkshire, near Wakefield and Barnsley
Woolley, Wiltshire
Woolley Colliery, South Yorkshire
Woolley Hall, a country house in West Yorkshire
Woolley, a street and area in Bradford-on-Avon, Wiltshire

Canada
Mount Woolley, a mountain in Alberta

People and fictional characters
Woolley (surname)

See also 
Wooley (disambiguation)
Woolly